Brama australis , the Southern Ray's bream or Pacific pomfret, is a species of marine ray-finned fish from the family Bramidae, the pomfrets. It is found in the southern Oceans.

Description
Brama australis has the typical laterally compressed body of a pomfret with a single dorsal fin which has no spines but contains stiffened fin rays. The anal fin also has no spines and contains fewer than 29 rays. The anal fin is similar to the dorsal fin but lacks the high anterior lobe of the dorsal fin.

Distribution
Brama australis is found throughout the subtropical to sub-antarctic waters of the whole Southern Pacific Ocean from New Zealand to Chile. It may have a circumpolar distribution in the Southern Hemisphere below 20° South. It is a highly migratory species.

Habitat and biology
It is a carnivorous species which feeds on the krill Euphasia mucronata in the southern summer off Chile, other crustaceans such as Pterygosquilla armata and hyperid amphipods are also important parts of its diet. It has also been reported to feed on crabs, squids and small fishes. It is a highly migratory species. It is a relatively fast growing species which can attain its full length in 8-9 years. The Southern Ray's bream has been found to be host to 12 species of metazoan parasites, the most common were the copepod Hatschekia conifera with the larvae of the cestode Hepatoxylon trichiuri being the next most important.

Utilisation
Brama australis is mainly caught using long lines and gill nets by artisanal fisheries off Chile. The species is heavily exploited and may be on the verges of being overfished. Rarely caught elsewhere, usually as bycatch in tuna fisheries.

References

External links 
 Catalogue of Life

australis
Chilean cuisine
Chilean culture
Fish described in 1838